13, Rue del Percebe (13, Barnacle Street) is a Spanish comic book created by Francisco Ibáñez that debuted in the pages of Tío Vivo magazine on March 6, 1961, and quickly became highly popular. The last strip was published in 1984. 

13, Rue del Percebe is a single panel that takes up the whole page that represents a humorous view of a building and the people who inhabit it. Each apartment is a panel in itself, with fixed characters with defined personalities. Usually each panel is not related to the others and can be read in any order, but sometimes an event affects more than one neighbor, and read in order the comic effect is more pronounced.

The inhabitants
The flat roof is inhabited by a debtor that is always imagining ingenious ways to evade his creditors, and by a poor black cat that is always been tortured by a cruelly ingenious mouse.
The debtor is inspired by Manuel Vázquez Gallego, another Bruguera cartoonist who also drew a self-parodic character.

The third floor is inhabited by a clumsy thief who's always stealing useless things and his long-suffering wife. Next door, there are a family with three mischievous young boys.

In the second floor there lives an elderly woman that's always having trouble with the animals she buys or adopts (usually dogs, but she also had others, including a whale), and a hopeless tailor with a lot of nerve (before this, a crazy scientist lived there with his monster, in an obvious parody of the monster of Frankenstein).

In the first floor dwell an incompetent veterinarian with an equally impossible clientele, and an overcrowded guesthouse run by a stingy woman.

In the ground, there's a grocery run by Mr. Senén, a distrustful and stingy man who's always cheating on his clients with the weight and genuineness of his merchandise (though sometimes he does get his comeuppance). At his side, there's the porter's lodge with its gossiping porter. Mr. Hurón (Spanish for "ferret") lives in the sewer's entrance in front of the building, and is often seen chatting with the porter or fending off the hazards which come with living in the sewer.

Lastly, there's the elevator. Through inanimate, the elevator's troubles are a running gag on the strip. Either it does not work properly, it's stolen, removed for repairs (and replaced with alternative elevation methods like a cannon or a bellows), or replaced by newer versions commissioned to a mixed list of builders (like a maker of chess pieces or a glassworker).

Sometimes, another of Ibáñez characters, Rompetechos, also visits the building, mostly causing Mr. Hurón some form of grief.

Other media 
Some of the characters from this strip appear in the movie La gran aventura de Mortadelo y Filemón, based on Ibañez's most well-known characters, Mortadelo y Filemón. In the movie, Filemón's mother lives in 13, Rue del Percebe and her neighbors are the strip characters.

This strip has been said to be the inspiration for the successful TV series Aquí no hay quien viva, but both the author of the comic and the authors of the series have denied this.

References

1961 comics debuts
1984 comics endings
Spanish comic strips
Gag-a-day comics
Gag cartoon comics
Spanish comics characters
Fictional Spanish people
Comics characters introduced in 1961
Fictional streets and roads